Vivian Bercovici is a Canadian academic. She is a former adjunct professor at the University of Toronto Faculty of Law (2012–2013) and was a member of the CBC's board of directors (2013–2014). In 2014, she was appointed as the Ambassador of Canada to Israel.

On July 19, 2016, she was replaced by career diplomat Deborah Lyons.

Vivian Bercovici is a regular contributor to the Jerusalem Post, National Post and The Hub.

An investigation by CBC News/Radio-Canada alleges that Bercovici worked for the Israeli intelligence firm Black Cube after the end of her diplomatic assignment.

See also 
 List of Canadian ambassadors to Israel

References 

Ambassadors of Canada to Israel
Living people
Politicians from Toronto
Canadian women ambassadors
Academic staff of the University of Toronto
Year of birth missing (living people)